Ulla Mariana Akselson (23 November 1924 – 20 February 2007), also known as Ulla Axelsson, was a Swedish actress.

References

External links

SFI - Svensk Filmdatabas - Ulla Akselson

1924 births
2007 deaths
People from Solna Municipality
Swedish actresses